Elland Upper Edge is a village on the B6114 road, near the town of Elland, in the Calderdale district, in the English county of West Yorkshire.

Amenities 
Elland Upper Edge has one church, Upper Edge Baptist Church, and a pub, The Rock Tavern.

References 
 A-Z West Yorkshire (page 119)

Villages in West Yorkshire
Elland